Vadassery Damodaran Satheesan (born 31 May 1964) is an Indian politician from the Indian National Congress, representing Paravur Assembly Constituency in Ernakulam District, serving as Leader of the Opposition (U D F) in the 15th Kerala Legislative Assembly.

Satheesan succeeded Congress leader Ramesh Chennithala as the Leader of Opposition after the 2021 Kerala Legislative Assembly election. He also serves as the Vice President of Kerala Pradesh Congress Committee.

Early life and career
Satheesan was born to K. Damodara Menon and V. Vilasini Amma on 31 May 1964 in Nettoor, Ernakulam District. He completed his primary education from Panangad High School, under-graduation from Sacred Heart College, Thevara, and post-graduation in Social Work (MSW) from Rajagiri College of Social Sciences. He then completed his Bachelor of Laws (L L B) from Kerala Law Academy Law College and Master of Laws (L L M) from Government Law College, Thiruvananthapuram.

For a brief period Satheesan practised law in the Kerala High Court. He is married to R. Lakshmi Priya, and the couple have a daughter Unnimaya.

Public career
Satheesan was the chairman of Mahatma Gandhi University Union during 1986-1987. He has also served as the secretary for National Students' Union.

. VD Satheesan political debut was in 1996 when he lost to CPI's candidate P Raju in the Kerala Legislative Assembly elections.

 Satheesan was first elected to the Kerala Legislative Assembly in 2001 when he was practising as an advocate in the Kerala High Court.
 In 2006 Kerala Assembly Elections, he won the election in Paravur Constituency against K M Dinakaran.
 In the next Kerala Legislative Assembly in 2011, he was again elected by defeating Pannyan Raveendran of Communist Party of India by 11349 votes.
 In 2016, he was re-elected as M L A from Paravur Constituency by defeating Sarada Mohan of Communist Party of India by a margin of 20,634 votes. He served as the Chief Whip of the Indian National Congress in the 12th Assembly.

 In 2021, he was elected to Kerala legislative assembly again for the fifth time from the Paravur constituency by defeating M. T. Nixon of Communist Party of India by a margin of 21,301 votes.

On 22 May 2021, Congress Working Committee declared V D Satheesan as the Leader of the Opposition in the 15th Kerala Legislative Assembly.

References

People from Ernakulam district
Malayali politicians
Living people
Indian National Congress politicians from Kerala
1964 births
Kerala MLAs 2001–2006
Kerala MLAs 2006–2011
Kerala MLAs 2011–2016
Kerala MLAs 2016–2021
Government Law College, Thiruvananthapuram alumni
Leaders of the Opposition in Kerala